Bo (Bosse) Johan Edvard Magnus Johnsson (Bo Irvall) (5 September 1902 – 29 July 1981) was a Swedish swimmer. He competed in the men's 200 metre breaststroke event at the 1924 Summer Olympics.

References

External links
 

1902 births
1981 deaths
Olympic swimmers of Sweden
Swimmers at the 1924 Summer Olympics
People from Falun
Swedish male breaststroke swimmers
Sportspeople from Dalarna County